Kevin Michael Grevey (born May 12, 1953) is a retired American professional basketball player. A 6'5" (1.96 m) swingman, the left-handed Grevey played for the Washington Bullets from 1975 to 1983 and the Milwaukee Bucks from 1983 to 1985. He worked as a Talent Scout with the Los Angeles Lakers for nineteen seasons and is now a scout with the Charlotte Hornets and a color commentator for various college basketball games, including on national radio with Westwood One.

University of Kentucky 

Grevey played college basketball at the University of Kentucky, where he was a member of legendary coach Adolph Rupp's last freshman class and played his three collegiate seasons (freshmen were not eligible to play varsity basketball at the time) under Rupp's successor, Joe B. Hall. He was named First-Team All-Southeastern Conference in all three of his college seasons and All-American in his junior and senior years. In his senior year Kentucky lost to UCLA in the championship game of the NCAA tournament in what would be the final game in the career of UCLA's legendary coach John Wooden; Grevey scored a game-high 34 points and was named to the all-Final Four team.

Upon completion of his collegiate career, Grevey scored 1,801 points, which at the time ranked him second in University of Kentucky history behind only Dan Issel's 2,138. His jersey number, 35, is retired by the University of Kentucky.

Professional career 
In 1975, Grevey was selected by the Washington Bullets in the first round (18th pick) of the NBA Draft and by the San Diego Sails in the first round (sixth pick) of the 1975 ABA Draft.  Grevey signed with the Bullets and played mostly as a backup small forward and shooting guard his first two seasons.  When Phil Chenier suffered a season-ending back injury early in the 1977–78 season, Grevey became the starting off guard and averaged 15.5 points per game.  The Bullets won their only NBA championship that season, led by Grevey, newly acquired Bob Dandridge and the future Hall-of-Fame duo of Elvin Hayes and Wes Unseld.

Grevey enjoyed four more solid seasons in Washington, averaging no less than 13.3 points per game. An injury sidelined him for half of the 1982–83 season and reduced him to a reserve for the remainder of his career. He played his final two seasons with the Milwaukee Bucks. In his ten NBA seasons, Grevey played 672 games and scored 7,364 points, for an average of 11.0 points per game. He thought for more than a decade to be the one to make the first three-pointer in the NBA, having been introduced in the 1979–80 NBA season.

NBA career statistics

Regular season

|-
| align="left" | 1975–76
| align="left" | Washington
| 56 || - || 9.0 || .371 || - || .897 || 1.1 || 0.5 || 0.2 || 0.1 || 3.8
|-
| align="left" | 1976–77
| align="left" | Washington
| 76 || - || 17.2 || .423 || - || .664 || 2.3 || 0.9 || 0.4 || 0.1 || 6.9
|-
| style="text-align:left;background:#afe6ba;" | 1977–78†
| align="left" | Washington
| 81 || - || 26.2 || .448 || - || .789 || 3.6 || 1.9 || 0.8 || 0.2 || 15.5
|-
| align="left" | 1978–79
| align="left" | Washington
| 65 || - || 28.6 || .453 || - || .772 || 3.6 || 2.4 || 0.7 || 0.2 || 15.5
|-
| align="left" | 1979–80
| align="left" | Washington
| 65 || - || 28.0 || .412 || .370 || .867 || 2.9 || 2.7 || 0.9 || 0.2 || 14.0
|-
| align="left" | 1980–81
| align="left" | Washington
| 75 || - || 34.9 || .453 || .331 || .841 || 2.9 || 4.0 || 0.9 || 0.2 || 17.2
|-
| align="left" | 1981–82
| align="left" | Washington
| 71 || 62 || 30.5 || .439 || .341 || .855 || 2.7 || 2.1 || 0.6 || 0.3 || 13.3
|-
| align="left" | 1982–83
| align="left" | Washington
| 41 || 11 || 18.4 || .388 || .395 || .783 || 1.2 || 1.2 || 0.4 || 0.2 || 7.2
|-
| align="left" | 1983–84
| align="left" | Milwaukee
| 64 || 3 || 14.4 || .451 || .283 || .893 || 1.3 || 1.2 || 0.4 || 0.1 || 7.0
|-
| align="left" | 1984–85
| align="left" | Milwaukee
| 78 || 6 || 15.2 || .448 || .242 || .822 || 1.3 || 1.2 || 0.4 || 0.0 || 6.1
|- class="sortbottom"
| style="text-align:center;" colspan="2"| Career
| 672 || 82 || 22.7 || .437 || .334 || .817 || 2.4 || 1.9 || 0.6 || 0.2 || 11.0
|}

Playoffs

|-
| align="left" | 1975–76
| align="left" | Washington
| 2 || - || 1.5 || .500 || - || .000 || 0.0 || 0.0 || 0.0 || 0.0 || 1.0
|-
| align="left" | 1976–77
| align="left" | Washington
| 9 || - || 25.0 || .409 || - || .652 || 1.8 || 0.9 || 0.2 || 0.6 || 9.7
|-
| style="text-align:left;background:#afe6ba;" | 1977–78†
| align="left" | Washington
| 21 || - || 27.8 || .444 || - || .811 || 2.9 || 2.0 || 0.5 || 0.1 || 15.5
|-
| align="left" | 1978–79
| align="left" | Washington
| style="background:#cfecec;"| 19* || - || 27.7 || .398 || - || .755 || 2.5 || 1.6 || 0.8 || 0.4 || 12.8
|-
| align="left" | 1979–80
| align="left" | Washington
| 2 || - || 36.0 || .533 ||style="background:#cfecec;"| .500* || 1.000 || 3.0 || 4.0 || 2.5 || 1.0 || 20.5
|-
| align="left" | 1981–82
| align="left" | Washington
| 7 || - || 22.7 || .411 || .500 || .842 || 1.4 || 1.6 || 0.4 || 0.1 || 9.4
|-
| align="left" | 1983–84
| align="left" | Milwaukee
| 5 || - || 5.4 || .222 || .000 || .667 || 0.4 || 0.2 || 0.0 || 0.0 || 1.6
|-
| align="left" | 1984–85
| align="left" | Milwaukee
| 5 || 0 || 5.6 || .308 || .000 || 1.000 || 0.4 || 0.4 || 0.4 || 0.0 || 2.4
|- class="sortbottom"
| style="text-align:center;" colspan="2"| Career
| 70 || 0 || 23.2 || .420 || .500 || .784 || 2.1 || 1.5 || 0.5 || 0.3 || 11.2
|}

References

External links 
 Kevin Grevey's University of Kentucky stats
Kevin Grevey's pro stats
The Enquirer's Top 100 – ranks Grevey #6
Player Statistics

1953 births
Living people
All-American college men's basketball players
American men's basketball players
Basketball players from Ohio
College basketball announcers in the United States
Kentucky Wildcats men's basketball players
Milwaukee Bucks players
Sportspeople from Hamilton, Ohio
San Diego Sails draft picks
Shooting guards
Small forwards
Washington Bullets draft picks
Washington Bullets players